4-way or Fourway can refer to:
an acoustic system containing four loudspeakers
a formation skydiving event, "4-way sequential", that has four members in each team
a Symmetric multiprocessing system with 4 processors
Fourway Athletics, a Hong Kong football team
Four-slide
Four-way switch
Fourway, Virginia (disambiguation)